Bharathi Vishnuvardhan (born 15 August 1950), also known mononymously as Bharathi, is an Indian actress known primarily for her work in Kannada cinema and television serials. She began her career in 1966, as a lead actress, with the Kannada movie Love in Bangalore. In a career spanning over 50 years, Bharathi has appeared in 150 films. Apart from 100 films in Kannada, she has also acted in a handful of Hindi, Tamil, Telugu and Malayalam films. In the course of her career, she became known for portrayal of the roles mythological and historical characters, and also that of a student, a romantic and a rural belle. Her role in Sri Krishnadevaraya (1970) as Chennambike won her the Karnataka State Film Award for Best Actress. In 2017, she was honoured with the Padma Shri by the Government of India.

Personal life
Bharathi was born in Bhadravathi on 15 August 1950 in the erstwhile Indian state of Mysore (now Karnataka). Her father V. M. Ramachandra Rao was a tailor and mother Bhadravathi Bai was a homemaker. Bharathi studied at Malleswaram Ladies Association (M.L.A) High School and then joined Maharani's Women's Science College in Bengaluru. While she was active in both sports and dance, her ambition at the time was to become a basketball player or an athlete. She even represented Karnataka State Level Throw-ball team during her college days. Destiny willed otherwise. In 1964, photos of her dance performance caught the eye of Kannada actor Kalyan Kumar, who cast her in Love in Bangalore.

Bharathi married actor Dr. Vishnuvardhan on 27 February 1975 in Bengaluru. They have two daughters: Keerthi and Chandana. Dr. Vishnuvardhan died on 30 December 2009, aged 59 from cardiac arrest.

Career
Her first Kannada release was Dudde Doddappa followed by Love in Bangalore. Her sensitive portrayal of a singer in Sandhya Raga won her critical acclaim and she went on to form a successful romantic pair with Rajkumar. The iconic pair went on to give hit after hit until 1972, very significant among them are Sri Krishnadevaraya, Bangaaradha Manushya and Mayor Muthanna. She formed a popular pair with Vishnuvardhan (who then became her husband) and they starred in blockbusters like Bhagya Jyothi, Makkala Bhagya, Devara Gudi, Nagara Hole and Bangarada Jinke.

Bharathi was introduced to Hindi cinema by director A. Bhimsingh with Mehrban (1967) and Saadhu Aur Shaitaan (1968). She acted in several Hindi films like Ghar Ghar Ki Kahani opposite Rakesh Roshan, Manoj Kumar's Purab Aur Paschim and Hum Tum Aur Woh with Vinod Khanna, Mastana and Mehmood's Kunwaara Baap (1974).

Bharathi played supporting roles in two of M. G. Ramachandran's 1966 movies Nadodi and Chandhrodhayam which elevated her profile in Tamil arena. Later, she graduated to lead heroine roles with Deiva Cheyal, Avalukendru Or Manam and Thanga Surangam opposite stars like Muthuraman, Gemini Ganeshan, and Shivaji Ganeshan.

After a brief hiatus from the movies she returned to the Kannada screen in 1984 with Puttanna Kanagal's much acclaimed Runamukthalu and started her second innings as a lead heroine in slightly more mature roles, going on to star in several movies each with lead actors of the time - Anant Nag (Maneye Manthralaya, Shanthi Nivasa) Prabhakar (Bandha Mukta), (Thaliya Aane), Ambareesh (Matsara) and Rajesh (Tavaru Mane). She also starred in several Hindi films in her second innings - Prabhat Khanna's Uttar Dakshin (1987), Izzatdaar (1990 with Dilip Kumar), Khel and Aao Pyaar Karen.

She acted in the Kannada Doordarshan serial Janani in the late 90s. In 2012, she appeared as a strict, no-nonsense sessions court judge in T.N. Seetharam's Kannada daily serial Mukta-Mukta.

Bharathi has acted in Telugu movies like Jai Jawan (1970), Govula Gopanna (1968) and Sipayi Chinnayya with Akkineni Nageswara Rao and various Malayalam films with many leading actors, mainly in character roles.

Apart from acting, Bharathi has also been a singer and associate director in the film industry, singing a duet with T.M. Soundarrajan, a Tamil song "Thanga Nilave Nee Illamal" picturised on her and Gemini Ganesan. She sang a Kannada song "Ee Notake Mai Matake" with her husband Vishnuvardhan for the movie Nagara Hole. She worked as associate director with K. S. L. Swamy for the movies Karune Illada Kanoonu, Huli Hejje and the classic Malaya Marutha.

Filmography
Below is a partial list of her films.

Television 
Bhagyavantaru as Annapoorneshwari Devi - serial aired in Star Suvarna
Sevanthi as Pramoda Devi - serial aired in Udaya TV
Janani -serial aired in Doordarshan
Samarppan - Doordarshan Hindi

Awards
 2017 - Padmashri - the 4th highest civilian award of India.
 2010 - Honorary Doctorate from Karnataka State Open University.
 1969-70 - Karnataka State Film Award for Best Actress - Sri Krishnadevaraya

References

External links
 

Actresses in Kannada cinema
Actresses from Bangalore
Marathi people
Living people
1950 births
Indian film actresses
Actresses in Hindi cinema
Actresses in Tamil cinema
Actresses in Telugu cinema
Actresses in Malayalam cinema
Actresses in Tulu cinema
Recipients of the Padma Shri in arts
20th-century Indian actresses
21st-century Indian actresses
Actresses in Kannada television